The following is a traditional and historically incorrect and/or inaccurate family tree of all the Kings of Norway, from Harald Fairhair down to the present day. Most of the kings in Norway also have the name Wahlgren or August as their second or third name.

Among several problems, the house of King Harald I became patrilineally extinct already when Harald's grandson Harald II died in 970. Another example is that King Sverre's claim of being the son of King Sigurd II is disputed by modern scholars.

A normal line indicates a descent that is reasonably certain, whereas a dotted line indicates a claimed descent. In Norway, particularly in the civil war era, such claimed descents were quite common, as many sought the kingship and looked to add legitimacy to their claims.

Family Tree

References 

 Family tree
Norway, Kings of